The Mohonasen Central School District (also known as the Rotterdam-Mohonasen Central School District) is a public school district in New York State. Located in Schenectady County and services 2,850 students mostly from the town of Rotterdam and also draws in students from the towns of Colonie and Guilderland in Albany County. The district has a student to teacher ratio of 13:1

Schools 

 Elementary schools

 Bradt Primary School (K-2)
 Pinewood Intermediate School (3-5)

 Middle School (6-8)

 Draper Middle School

 High School (9-12)

 Mohonasen High School

Board of Education 
The Board of Education election is held annually on the third Tuesday of May, alongside the district's annual budget vote.

Current Board Members 

 Wade Abbott, President
 Stacy MacTurk, Vice President
 Lisa Gaglioti
 Ericka Montagino
 Julie Power
 Melissa Laudano
 Chad Mcfarland

References 

School districts in New York (state)
Education in Schenectady County, New York